Justin Baker Ries (b. 1976) is an American marine scientist, best known for his contributions to ocean acidification, carbon sequestration, and biomineralization research.

Biography 
Ries was born in Baltimore, Maryland in 1976, and attended the Friends School of Baltimore from 1982 to 1994. He received a B.A. from Franklin and Marshall College  in 1998, and a Ph.D. from the Johns Hopkins University in 2005 for a dissertation  'Experiments on the effect of secular variation in seawater Mg/Ca (calcite and aragonite seas) on calcareous biomineralization'. He received postdoctoral training at the Johns Hopkins University, the Woods Hole Oceanographic Institution, and the California Institute of Technology. Ries was a professor at the University of North Carolina at Chapel Hill for five years before becoming a professor at Northeastern University in 2013. At Northeastern, he is affiliated with the Department of Marine and Environmental Sciences, the Marine Science Center, and the Institute for Coastal Sustainability.

Major discoveries 
Ries is best known for his contributions to ocean acidification and biomineralization research. He and his colleagues made the publicized and controversial discovery that anthropogenic CO2-induced ocean acidification does not negatively impact all species of marine calcifying organisms, but can also have neutral and even positive effects on some species. Ries also discovered that ocean acidification can alter the shell mineralogy, shell structure, predator-prey dynamics, and calcifying fluid pH of marine organisms, and produced the first geochemical model of the calcifying fluid that could predict organisms' responses to future ocean acidification. Ries and colleagues are also credited with discovering that the current rate of CO2-induced ocean acidification is the fastest in Earth history and that many species of marine calcifiers today inhabit seawater that is already undersaturated with respect to their shell mineral.

Inventions 
Ries holds carbon sequestration patents describing biologically and geologically inspired methods for removing and mineralizing CO2 from the flue-streams of fossil-fuel-fired power plants and transoceanic vessels, and producing carbon-negative cement as a byproduct.

Honors 
Honors include induction into the Phi Beta Kappa and Sigma Xi honor societies, receipt of the German  Award and the Woods Hole Oceanographic Institution Ocean and Climate Change Postdoctoral Fellowship.

References 

1976 births
Living people
Scientists from Baltimore
American patent holders
American male writers
Biogeochemists
Paleobiologists
21st-century American zoologists
Sedimentologists
American ecologists
Franklin & Marshall College alumni
Johns Hopkins University alumni
University of North Carolina at Chapel Hill faculty
Northeastern University faculty
21st-century American inventors